Maine Question 2, formally An Act to Establish The Fund to Advance Public Kindergarten to Grade 12 Education, was a citizen-initiated referendum question that appeared on the Maine November 8, 2016 statewide ballot. It sought to increase state aid to public schools by instituting a surcharge of 3% on Maine income taxes for those with income above $200,000 a year.  As the Maine Legislature and Governor Paul LePage declined to enact the proposal as written, it appeared on the ballot along with elections for President of the United States, Maine's two U.S. House seats, the Legislature, and various local elections.

The question was passed by roughly 10,000 votes.  The surtax created by the question was repealed as part of state budget negotiations on July 3, 2017 that added $162 million to public education funding from general revenue.

Background
In 2003, Maine voters passed a referendum calling for the state to pay for 55% of the cost of operating public schools, as a way to reduce pressure on local property taxes.  That percentage had never been met.  To attempt to reach that target, a group called Stand Up for Students announced that it would start a petition drive to implement a 3% surcharge on Maine income taxes paid on those with incomes above $200,000 a year, estimated to be the top 2% of earners in Maine. It is estimated that such a tax surcharge would result in $110 million a year in revenue.

The petition drive was carried out by some paid signature gatherers, but was largely done by volunteers from the Maine Education Association and the Maine People's Alliance, a liberal organizing group.  MEA members were offered $25 Visa gift cards for every 100 signatures they gathered. The office of Maine Secretary of State Matthew Dunlap certified that the proposal qualified for the ballot on March 2, 2016, stating that 66,849 signatures were valid.

The exact wording of the question was disputed.  Secretary Dunlap proposed the wording "Do you want to establish a fund to support kindergarten through 12th grade public education by adding a three percent surcharge on Maine taxable income above $200,000?".  During the required public comment period before the wording was finalized, the Governor's Office filed an objection to the proposed wording, stating that the word 'tax' or 'surtax' should be used instead of 'surcharge'.  Doing so, they stated, would have been consistent with prior referendums calling for generating revenue. A Stand Up for Students spokesman called the objection an effort to confuse voters, citing tax cuts enacted by Governor Paul LePage. Dunlap had until June 24 to make a final decision, which was only possible to appeal by going to court.

Dunlap released the final wording of the question on June 23, which read as "Do you want to add a 3% tax on individual Maine taxable income above $200,000 to create a state fund that would provide direct support for student learning in kindergarten through 12th grade public education?"

Campaign
The Maine State Chamber of Commerce formed a PAC called No on Question 2 on August 2, 2016.  Chamber President Dana Connors said that while they support strong education funding, it should be done in a manner that does not affect the economy. He went on to state that such a tax would discourage professionals from living in Maine.

Notable endorsements

Supporters
Maine Association of School Libraries
Maine Children's Alliance
Maine Education Association
Maine Parent Teacher Association
Maine Small Business Coalition
Machinists (IAM) Local S7
Maine People's Resource Center
Maine People's Alliance
Maine AFL–CIO
Maine State Employees Association
Maine Center for Economic Policy

Opponents
John Baldacci, former Governor of Maine
Paul LePage, Governor of Maine
Stephen Bowen, former Commissioner of the Maine Department of Education
Jim Rier, former Commissioner of the Maine Department of Education
Maine Heritage Policy Center
Maine State Chamber of Commerce
Bangor Daily News
MaineToday Media newspapers; Portland Press Herald, Kennebec Journal, Morning Sentinel

Polling

Results
Uncertified results indicated that Question 2 passed by a margin of around 10,000 votes. Due to the closeness of the result, opponents of Question 2 filed a petition for a recount, then withdrew their petition on November 29.

Repeal 
The creation of the surtax became a point of contention in state budget negotiations for the 2017–2018 budget, with Governor LePage and minority House Republicans opposed to any tax increases in the budget. A budget that did not eliminate the surtax passed the Republican-controlled Maine Senate, but not the House, leading to a shutdown of Maine state government at the end of the fiscal year on June 30. Three days later, negotiators agreed to, and LePage signed, a budget that eliminated the surtax but added an additional $162 million for public education to the budget.

References

External links
Stand Up for Students, supporters of the initiative
No Gain 2 Maine  opponents of the initiative

United States education law
2016 Maine ballot measures
Taxation in Maine